Wunderlich were a brand of decorative metal panels used for pressed metal ceilings and other architectural elements in Australia.

History
The Wunderlich company was established by Ernest Julius Wunderlich in Sydney, New South Wales, Australia in 1885. Initially the panels were imported from Berlin, Germany but later patents were taken out and the panels were manufactured in Australia.

The panels were produced until the 1950s when popular tastes changed away from these traditional elements. In 1983, production of the panels recommenced to meet the needs of restorations of period buildings.

Notable uses of Wunderlich products 
 Barnes and Co. Trading Place
 Bishop's House, Toowoomba
 Esk War Memorial
 First World War Honour Board, National Australia Bank (308 Queen Street)
 Graceville Uniting Church
 Gympie Court House
Mount Macedon Memorial Cross
 National Australia Bank (308 Queen Street)
 North Pine Pumping Station
 Our Lady of Assumption Convent, Warwick
 Santa Barbara, New Farm
Sandgate Town Hall
Sydney Town Hall
 St Isidore's

See also 
 Tin ceiling

References

Further reading
  — full text available online
 

Ceilings
Architecture in Australia